Super Princess Peach is a platform video game developed by Tose and published by Nintendo for the Nintendo DS. It was released in Japan in October 2005 and worldwide the following year. Super Princess Peach is the second game to feature Princess Peach as the only main playable character after the game Princess Toadstool's Castle Run released in 1990 on the Nelsonic Game Watch.

The game follows Peach's trip to Vibe Island to rescue Mario and Luigi, who have been kidnapped by Bowser, in a reversal of the damsel in distress trope.

First announced by Nintendo in 2004, Super Princess Peach was released in Japan in October 2005 and later elsewhere in 2006. It is one of the best-selling Nintendo DS games with 1.15 million units sold worldwide.

Gameplay

Super Princess Peach plays similarly to traditional platformers. There are eight worlds, each of which contains six levels and a boss battle that leads the player to the next world. Three captive Toads are hidden throughout each level, with each boss battle holding a single Toad contained in a bubble. In order to play the final boss battle, the player must rescue all of the Toads. Beating a boss will unlock three new levels for the next world. There are a total of 24 extra levels to unlock.  In addition, the game features a shop where players can buy items. Using coins as currency the player can purchase incremental upgrades to expand the heart gauge or the emotion meter, as well as Perry the Parasol's abilities. Peach has infinite lives, so players can continue as much as they please. By finishing the game and completing all bonuses, the player can buy a drink named "Endless Vibe". It allows Peach to use her vibes without having the vibe meter decrease, meaning that the player can use her powers as long as they please. The game's bonuses include a glossary, puzzles, mini-games, a music room, and replays of Perry's dreams. There are three mini-games within the game and the levels are unlocked as the player finds more mini game pieces in the levels. All of the mini-games have the player control Toad in various activities (such as a platforming mode).

Emotion Meter 
The emotion meter corresponds to the four vibe powers she has. The emotions at Vibe Island affect everybody, even enemies, while Peach can change hers at will. The four emotions are joy, gloom, rage, and calm. When the player taps on each mood it will activate a different ability that helps solve puzzles and defeat enemies. Each use will drain the player's vibe meter. The bar can be restored by capturing blue turquoise jewels or absorbing enemies using Perry the parasol.

Perry 
Perry is a talking umbrella and Peach's ally in this game. Unlike Mario, jumping on enemies does not defeat them; Peach must use Perry to hit them. The player can press "B" to immediately sweep them aside or "X" to put them on top of the umbrella. Once an enemy is on top of the umbrella, the player may press "X" again to put the enemy down, "B" to throw the enemy, or down on the D-pad to absorb the enemy, which refills part of the emotion meter. As the game progresses, Perry gains new abilities.

Plot
Near the location of the Mushroom Kingdom, a fabled land known as Vibe Island is said to hide a treasure known as the Vibe Scepter, a magical weapon that can be used to control the emotions of other people. Hearing of the island's legendary powers, Bowser builds a summer getaway home on the island in hopes of using it to his advantage.

After his second-in-command, Army Hammer Bro finds the Scepter for him, Bowser hatches a plan to capture the Mario Brothers. Army Hammer Bro. entrusts the scepter to a Goomba and sends it into the castle.

With the residents of the castle under the influence of the Scepter, the Army Hammer Bro. and his troops successfully capture Mario, Luigi, and several Toads, imprisoning them all across the island. Goomba becomes influenced by the Vibe Scepter and begins swinging it around, causing Bowser and his minions to lose control of their emotions.

Meanwhile, Princess Peach and Toadsworth return to her castle after a short walk only to find the residents in emotional disarray and a note from Bowser saying that he has captured Mario and Luigi. Maddened with rage, Peach decides that she is the only one who can rescue the Mario Brothers and sets out to go to Vibe Island. Shortly before her departure, Toadsworth is reluctant to see Peach travel on her own, and gives her a sentient parasol named Perry to help her on her journey.

Peach and Perry travel through eight different areas across the island, rescuing various Toads and defeating enemies along the way. Because of the Goomba's earlier flaunting of the scepter, emotional energy had been dispersed all over the island causing the residents to experience various moods. Peach is affected but has better control, even gaining new abilities from each emotion. After defeating a boss and clearing the current area, Perry's backstory is revealed in flashbacks. Long ago, Perry was a young boy with magical powers whose earliest memories were in the woods on the mountainside of Vibe Island. He was adopted by an old man who he came to call "Grandpa". One day, Perry was confronted by a pair of enigmatic magicians who had seemingly heard of the boy's powers and transformed him into an umbrella. The wizard and his henchman captured Perry and brought him toward an unconfirmed location, but he managed to escape by wiggling free from his captors and fell onto the road. Some time later, a traveling merchant found him and sold him to Toadsworth.

After defeating Giant Kamek and freeing Luigi, the duo arrive at Bowser's Villa where they meet Bowser and Army Hammer Bro. Bowser uses the Vibe Scepter to increase Army Hammer Bro's power with rage, Peach besting him nonetheless. She then defeats Bowser. The Koopa King uses the Vibe Scepter to turn into a giant, yet Peach and Perry defeat him again by throwing Bob-ombs at him, then whacking him out of the villa with the Scepter. After Bowser's final defeat, Peach frees Mario, they rejoice and return to the Mushroom Kingdom alongside Luigi and the Toads, with the fate of the Vibe Scepter left unknown.

Release
Super Princess Peach was first announced by Nintendo in October 2004 with the exclusion of a posted release date. It was first released in Japan on October 20, 2005. It later came out in North America and Europe on February 27 and May 26, 2006, respectively.

Reception

Super Princess Peach received generally positive reviews from critics, it currently has an average rating of 76.60% on GameRankings, and of 75% on Metacritic.

As of July 25, 2007, 1.15 million copies of Super Princess Peach have been sold worldwide. It is one of the best-selling Nintendo DS video games.

The game's lack of difficulty was intensely criticized. Gaming website GameSpy noted that the number of shop items and the "Joy" vibe made it "quite hard to die". Another web site, IGN, was more critical, criticizing Nintendo for "going out of its way" to "spoon-feed" the player full of tips and information. Reviewer Ryan Davis from GameSpot similarly wrote that the game was "way too easy for the average platformer player." X-Plays Morgan Webb gave it a 4/5, commenting that the game was very easy to play and should be played by first timers to platform games.

The nature of the vibes and Nintendo's marketing campaign were also noted in some reviews. Davis accused Nintendo of putting "weird sexist undercurrents" into the game, while GameSpy'''s Bryn Williams wondered if Nintendo was trying to say that all females were "emo". Craig Harris from IGN said that the copy that Nintendo sent to him came in a box scented with perfume.

The game is listed on TheGamers list of the top "10 DS Games That Deserve A Remake For Nintendo Switch". CBR.com claimed that "Super Princess Peach 2 would provide some excellent continuity". DigitallyDowloaded noted the game in a list of "Ten Nintendo DS games that need a 3DS sequel". LevelSkip stated "Princess Peach is One of the Most Iconic Female Nintendo Characters" and "Many Fans Demand a Sequel".

 Accolades 

 Legacy 
From February 2006 to March 2007, the magazine  published a comical manga based on the game called  created by Kazumi Sugiyama. Like the original game, the story deals with Peach, traveling with Perry and joined by Toadsworth, to save her friends abducted by Bowser.

The game is referenced throughout the Super Smash Bros series, including Peach's moveset with pink hearts and her final smash with the "calm" vibe.

In the manga Super Mario-kun, Peach is using her vibe powers and appears with Perry.Volume n°37

In Mario Super Sluggers and Mario Sports Mix'', Peach's special move is based on the powers of her emotions. Peach summons giant pink hearts and launches them towards her opponents, making them fall in love with her and stunning them.

Notes

References

2005 video games
Nintendo DS games
Nintendo DS-only games
Mario video games
Platform games
Tose (company) games
Video games featuring female protagonists
Video games developed in Japan
Video games set on fictional islands
Single-player video games
Mario spin-off games
Works about emotions